= Nadaka Nature Park =

Public park in Gresham, Oregon, U.S.

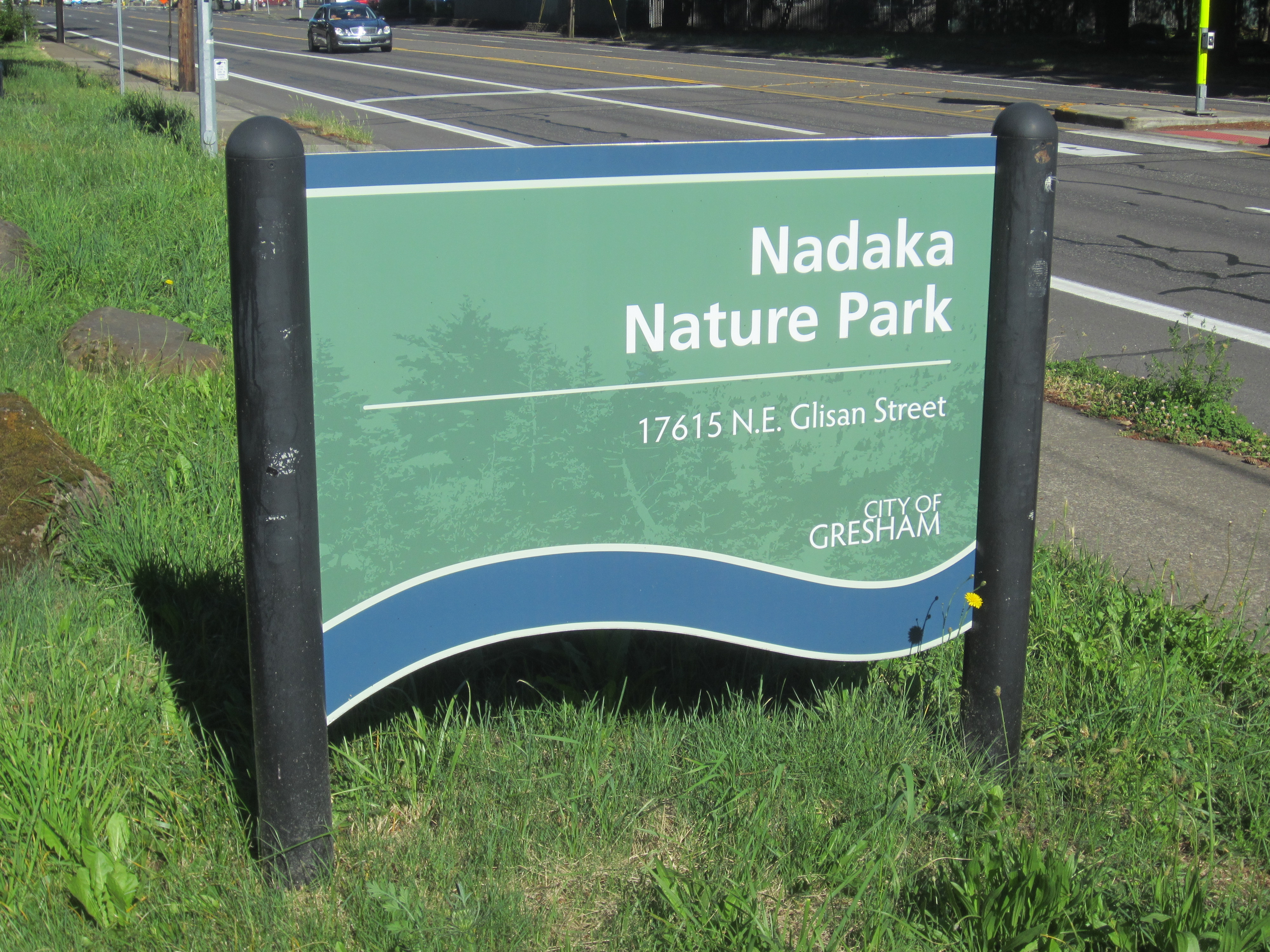
- Park sign, 2022
- Interactive map of Nadaka Nature Park
- Location: Gresham, Oregon, U.S.
- Coordinates: 45°31′37″N 122°28′54″W

Nadaka Nature Park is a 12-acre (4.9 ha) public park in Gresham, Oregon.
